Igny is a commune in the Essonne department in Île-de-France in northern France.

Population

Inhabitants of Igny are known as Ignissois in French.

See also
Communes of the Essonne department

References

External links

Official website 

Mayors of Essonne Association 

Communes of Essonne